Rudolph B. Davila (April 27, 1916 – January 26, 2002), born in El Paso, Texas, was a United States Army officer, of Spanish-Filipino descent, who received the Medal of Honor for his actions in Italy during World War II. He was the only person of Filipino ancestry to receive the medal for his heroic actions in the European theatre. He was initially awarded the Distinguished Service Cross. However, in 1998, after an extensive review, his medal was upgraded to the Medal of Honor.

Early years
Davila was born to a Spanish father and a Filipino mother in El Paso, Texas. His family moved to Watts, California when he was a child. There he was raised and received his primary and secondary education. Davila enlisted in the Army from Los Angeles in March 1941.

World War II
Davila was a United States Army Staff Sergeant assigned to Company H of the 7th Infantry Regiment, 3rd Infantry Division. On May 28, 1944, his company was involved in an offensive, near Artena, Italy, which broke through the German mountain strongholds surrounding the Anzio beachhead.  His company was under a heavy enemy attack and for an unknown reason his machine gunners were reluctant to risk putting their guns into action. Realizing that his company was in danger, Davila crawled 50 yards to the nearest machine gun and fired over 750 rounds into the enemy strongholds in the foothills.

His fellow machine gunners reacted and Davila directed their firepower with hand and arm signals until the two enemy hostile machine guns were silenced. Despite being wounded by the enemy, he continued his assault by engaging the enemy from the turret of a burnt tank.

Davila then spotted what he believed to be a rifle barrel in a farmhouse window.  He grabbed a rifle and two grenades and went inside the farmhouse.  He tossed the grenades at the attic and shot at the troops inside, destroying two more enemy machine gun nests. The enemy was forced to abandon their prepared positions.

Davila received a battlefield commission to Lieutenant and even though a Captain in the rifle company said he would recommend Davila for the Medal of Honor, the highest honor for battlefield valor, Davila was instead awarded the Distinguished Service Cross, the Army's second highest military honor.

Davila continued to serve with his company after he recovered from his leg wound.  A few months after the Artena attack, Davila found himself in France's Vosges Mountains.  He received a chest wound from a shell which ricocheted off a tree as he was ordering his men to storm a German tank.  The tank shell caused injuries that left his right arm paralyzed.

Back home
Davila was treated for his wounds at a hospital in Modesto, California. There he met a nurse by the name of Harriet and three months later they were married.  He continued his education and earned a bachelor's and master's degrees from the University of Southern California, and became a high school history teacher in Los Angeles. He moved to Vista in 1977 with his wife after he retired from teaching.

His wife, Harriet Davila, lobbied Army officials to award the Medal of Honor to her husband based on the actions he performed during the Allied offensive in Italy, after she became aware of her husband's heroic actions. For years, she petitioned the government for her husband's medal — making phone calls, writing letters and researching military records to prove her husband deserved the Medal of Honor.  No reply ever came.

DSC upgraded to Medal of Honor
In 1996, Hawaii Senator Daniel Akaka secured a Congressionally mandated review of records for Asian-Americans  who had earned the Distinguished Service Cross in World War II.  Congress reviewed the records to determine whether they were unfairly denied the military's highest award for valor.

On June 21, 2000, President Bill Clinton, bestowed the Medal of Honor on Davila and 21 other World War II servicemen of Asian descent at a White House ceremony. Only seven of 22 recipients were still alive when the medals were handed out. Previously only two of the 40,000-plus Asian-Americans who served in World War II had been awarded the Medal of Honor.

Army Secretary Louis Caldera inducted the soldiers into the Pentagon's Hall of Heroes on June 22. Harriet Davila, his wife, had died six months before, on December 25, 1999.

Medal of Honor citation

Later years
Subsequently, Davila was honored by the city of Vista. He served as the guest speaker at the Veterans of Foreign Wars' Memorial Day ceremony in 2001.

Davila died of cancer on January 26, 2002, in Vista, California.  He was buried at Arlington National Cemetery, Arlington, Virginia.

Awards and recognitions
Among Davila's decorations and medals were the following:

 Medal of Honor

 Purple Heart
 American Campaign Medal
 European-African-Middle Eastern Campaign Medal
 World War II Victory Medal

Badges:
 Combat Infantryman Badge
Foreign unit decorations
   Fourragère cord

See also

 List of Medal of Honor recipients
 List of Medal of Honor recipients for World War II
 Hispanic Medal of Honor recipients
 List of Filipino Americans
 Hispanic Americans in World War II

References

External links
 Rudolph B Davila at ArlingtonCemetery.net, an unofficial website

1916 births
2002 deaths
United States Army personnel of World War II
United States Army Medal of Honor recipients
Recipients of the Distinguished Service Cross (United States)
People from El Paso, Texas
People from Vista, California
United States Army officers
American military personnel of Filipino descent
American people of Spanish descent
Burials at Arlington National Cemetery
University of Southern California alumni
World War II recipients of the Medal of Honor
People from Watts, Los Angeles
Military personnel from California
Military personnel from Texas